St. Thomas College is a Catholic school in Kotte, Sri Lanka. A national school, it serves a mix of boys and girls, from grades 1 to 13.

History
St. Thomas College was established by Rev. Father Zacharias Dabrera, OMI, and formally opened by Rev. Father J. B. Meary, OMI, on 8 May 1928, the feast-day of St. Michael the Archangel, with 53 students. The new school was set up in the small verandah of the mission house, Debrera's residence. As the number of students increased the two wings of the church were used as classrooms. The school was provisionally registered on 9 June 1928. In 2017 the school had 1,400 students and 70 staff.

Traditions
The school colours are scarlet, representing the love of work and sacrifice in the hearts of the pupils, white for the purity in their lives, and gold for perfection and success.

Sports and music
The school has produced many musicians and numerous outstanding cricketers.

Cricket
St Thomas' plays its annual Big Match, the Battle of Kotte, against Sri Jayawardenepura Maha Vidyalaya. The first Battle of Kotte was held in 1975 and has occurred on a regular basis for over forty years. Since 2007 both teams have also competed against each other in a one day match, for the Dr. G. N. Perera Memorial Trophy.

Notable alumni
 Angeline Gunathilake, singer
 Nalin Perera, 46th Chief Justice of Sri Lanka
 Roger Seneviratne, actor, politician
 Andy Solomons, first-class cricketer
 Chandimal Jayasinghe, beautician, director of Miss World (Sri Lanka)

Notable staff
 Maxwell Silva, former principal, Auxiliary Bishop of the Archdiocese of Colombo

Reference

Schools in Sri Jayawardenepura Kotte
Educational institutions established in 1928
1928 establishments in Ceylon